The Atlantean language is a constructed language created by Marc Okrand, especially for the Walt Disney Feature Animation film Atlantis: The Lost Empire. The language was intended by the script-writers to be a possible mother language, and Okrand crafted it to include a vast Indo-European word stock with its very own grammar, which is at times described as highly agglutinative, inspired by Sumerian and North American Indigenous languages.

Creation

The Atlantean language (Dig Adlantisag) is a historically constructed, artistic language put together by Marc Okrand for Disney's 2001 film Atlantis: The Lost Empire and associated media. The Atlantean language is therefore based both on historic reconstructions as well as on the elaborate fantasy/science fiction of the Atlantis: The Lost Empire mythos. The fictional principles upon which the Atlantean language was created are: Atlantean is the “Tower of Babel language”, the “root dialect” from which all languages descended; it has existed without change since sometime before 100,000 B.C., in the First or Second Age of Atlantis until the present.

To accomplish this, Okrand looked for common characteristics from various world languages and was also heavily inspired by the Proto-Indo-European language. His main source of words (roots and stems) for the language is Proto-Indo-European, but Okrand combines this with Biblical Hebrew, later Indo-European languages such as Latin and Greek, and a variety of other known or reconstructed ancient languages.

Writing systems
Atlantean has its own script created expressly for the movie by John Emerson with the help of Marc Okrand, and inspired by ancient alphabetical scripts, most notably Semitic. There are, however, different kinds of transliteration into the Roman script.

Atlantean Script

There is no punctuation or capitalization in the native Atlantean Writing System. Okrand based this on ancient writing systems. The Atlantean Script is normally in boustrophedon, that is to say it is written left to right for the first line, right to left the second, and left to right again the third, to continue the pattern. This order was also suggested by Okrand, based on ancient writing systems, and it was accepted because, as he explained, "It's a back-and-forth movement, like water, so that worked."

The Atlantean script includes more characters than are actually employed in the language itself. These letters being c, f, j, q, v, x, z, ch, or th, they were created so that Atlantean might be used as a simple cipher code in the media and for promotional purposes.  They are all also based on diverse ancient characters, just like the rest of the alphabet.

Roman Script
Apart from the native Atlantean script created for the show, the language can be transcribed using the Roman script. There are two versions for doing so:

 Standard Transcription, how the language is transliterated by Marc Okrand himself.
 Reader's Script, a Berlitz-style notation devised by Okrand, which he hoped would make the Atlantean easier to read for the actors.

Example sentence, broken down:

The following is a table that shows the correspondences between the different modes of transcription and also provides the probable IPA values.

Numerals
John Emerson, Marc Okrand, and the filmmakers also created numerals for 0–9. They are stacked horizontally, however, and hold place values of 1, 20, and 400. Their components are based on Mayan numerals and internally composed for the font (example above) like Roman numerals. If used according to the now-offline Official Website's directions, they are used, alternatively, like Arabic numerals.

Numeral suffixes
Ordinals are formed adding the suffix -(d)lag: sey 'three', seydlag 'third'.  The d is omitted if the root ends with an obstruent or nasal consonant: dut 'two', dutlag 'second'. Fractions are formed with the suffix -(d)lop: kut 'four', kutlop 'quarter', sha 'five', shadlop 'fifth (part)'. And finally, distributives are formed with the suffix noh: din 'one', dinnoh 'one at a time, one each'.

Phonology

Consonants

Vowels
Atlantean's phonetic inventory includes a vowel system with five phonemes.  Most vowels have two prominent allophonic realizations, depending on whether it occurs in a stressed or unstressed syllable.

Vowels in stressed syllables tend to be tense, and likewise unstressed ones tend to be more lax. There are three diphthongs, namely ay, ey, oy.

Aside from the stressed-syllable-based vowel system, the only other example of prominent phonological phenomenon seems to be a special kind of sandhi occurring in verbs, when the pronoun is combined with the aspect marker.

When the suffix for the first person singular -ik combines with tenses that employ -i, -o (Past and Future tenses), it becomes -mik.
bernot-o-ik → bernot-o-mik

But when combined with suffixes that feature -e (Present tenses), the same suffix becomes -kik.
bernot-e-ik → bernot-e-kik

Grammar
Atlantean has a very strict subject–object–verb word order, with no deviations from this pattern attested. Adjectives and nouns in the genitive case follow the nouns they modify, adpositions appear only in the form of postpositions, and modal verbs follow the verbs that they modify and subsequently take all personal and aspectual suffixes. However, adverbs precede verbs. The language includes the use of an interrogative particle to form questions with no variation in word order.

Some sentences appear to employ some kind of particles sometimes termed "sentence connectors". These particles are of obscure meaning but are theorized to relate two clauses in a logical yet idiomatic manner. The exact meaning and usage of these particles is not known, but without them sentences are difficult to reconcile with their translations.

In the example above there is no actual mention of the consequences for outsiders, yet the subtitle in the movie translates it as a warning even without any mention of living or dying. A possibility exists that, in order to match the lip movement of the characters in the movie and the time of the dialogue, the language had to be shortened, often leaving out key parts of the sentence. It is known that the Atlantean lines in the movie were ad-libbed afterwards.

In this example the sentences seem to be better connected, and the particle is rendered as almost "but, yet". It is difficult to reconcile the two, however.

Nouns
Atlantean has seven cases for nouns, five for pronouns and two for numbers.

Grammatical cases

Notes:

Other suffixes

Nouns are marked as plural with the suffix -en. Case suffixes never precede the -en plural suffix.  "-Mok" occurs after it.

Pronouns

There are five cases for pronouns.

Grammatical cases

Notes:

Verbs
Verbs are inflected with two suffixes, one for tense/aspect and the next for person/number.

Tense/aspect suffixes
OBLG:obligatory mood
POSB:possible

Mood and Voice suffixes

See also

 Languages in Star Wars - Another Disney property with constructed languages

Notes

References
Cynthia, Benjamin. "Atlantis: The Lost Empire : Welcome to my World." New York: Random House: 2001.
Ehrbar, Greg.  "Atlantis: The Lost Empire." Milwaukee: Dark Horse Comics: June 2001.
Hahn, Don; Wise, Kirk; Trousdale, Gary et al.  "2-Disc Collector’s Edition: Atlantis: The Lost Empire."
"Disney Adventures" magazine, Summer Issue 2001.
Howard, James N. "Atlantis: The Lost Empire An Original Walt Disney Records Soundtrack" : Limited Taiwanese Edition. Taiwan and Hong Kong: Walt Disney Records: Represented by Avex: 2001.
Kurtti, Jeff. "Atlantis Subterranean Tours: A Traveler’s Guide to the Lost City (Atlantis the Lost Empire)." New York: Disney Editions: 2001.
Kurtti, Jeff. "The Journal of Milo Thatch." New York: Disney Editions: 2001.
Murphy, Tab et al. "Atlantis, the Lost Empire : The Illustrated Script." New York : Disney Editions: 2001.

External links
 Atlantean Language Institute (archive) – Provides a dictionary, grammar guide, and corpus
 Henning's Old Introduction to the Language (archive)
 Atlantean alphabet on Omiglot

1996 introductions
Language
Constructed languages
Constructed languages introduced in the 1990s
Fictional Atlanteans
Fictional languages
Subject–object–verb languages